Grimaldi Industri AB of Stockholm, Sweden, is a holding company that owns:
 Cycleurope – A group of companies that manufacture bicycles and related items with the brands: Bianchi, Crescent, DBS, Everton, Gitane, Kildemoes, Koppla, Monark, Peugeot, Puch, Sjösala, Spectra, Tec
 Contento
 Grimaldis Mekaniska Verkstad
 Karlsson Spools
 Learnify
 Morgana
 Plockmatic International
 Pricer
 3nine

Grimaldi is 100% owned by Salvatore Grimaldi.

References

External links
Grimaldi Industri website
Cycleurope website
Plockmatic International website

 
Cycle manufacturers of Sweden